Frank Clarke Fraser  (29 March 1920 – 17 December 2014) was a Canadian medical geneticist. Spanning the fields of science and medicine, he was Canada's first medical geneticist, one of the creators of the discipline of medical genetics in North America, and laid the foundations in the field of Genetic Counselling, which has enhanced the lives of patients worldwide. Among his many accomplishments, Fraser pioneered work in the genetics of cleft palate and popularized the concept of multifactorial disease. Fraser is an iconic figure in Canadian medicine, as well as a biomedical pioneer, a fine teacher, and an outstanding scientist.

Biography
Born in Norwich, Connecticut, he returned with his family to Canada when he was an infant. After a few years in Dublin, where his father, Frank Wise Fraser was Canadian Trade Commissioner, the family moved to Jamaica, where he received his primary and secondary school education at Munro College. He received a Bachelor of Science degree in 1940 from Acadia University, a Master of Science degree in 1941, a Ph.D. in 1945, and a Doctor of Medicine degree in 1950 from McGill University. During World War II, he served in the Royal Canadian Air Force but did not go overseas.

Before Fraser took the stage, genetics and medicine were two very separate fields. There was no vision for the potential of genetics in human medicine. But very soon, Fraser turned his attention from fruit flies and mice to human genetics, and became the founder of the first Canadian medical genetics department in a paediatric hospital, aptly named the F. Clarke Fraser Clinical Genetics Centre at McGill University in 1995.

 1950:     joined McGill University as an Assistant Professor of Genetics. 
 1955:     appointed an Associate and in 1960 was made a full professor. 
 1970-82   was the Molson Professor of Genetics in the Department of Biology. 
 1973-82,  was also a Professor of Paediatrics. 
 1979-82,  Professor in the McGill Centre for Human Genetics. 
 1979      Founding co-director of the Medical Research Council of Canada Group in Medical Genetics, the longest lasting group in the history of the MRC.
 1952-82   Founder and Director of the Department of Medical Genetics at the Montreal Children's Hospital. 
 1982-85,  Professor of Clinical Genetics at Memorial University of Newfoundland. 
 1990-93,  Director of the Genetics Working Group of the Royal Commission on New Reproductive Technologies.

Fraser has served as president of the major North American societies in Genetics and Teratology and has won almost every award in his field.
 1966   Fellow of the Royal Society of Canada. 
 1984   Officer of the Order of Canada. 
 1999   Government of Quebec's Prix Wilder-Penfield, awarded for achievement in the biomedical sciences. 
 2012   Elected to the Canadian Medical Hall of Fame.
He has been awarded four honorary doctorates, from Acadia University (1967), SUNY at Potsdam, Dalhousie University (2003) and McGill University (2010).

Fraser made contributions in three areas. He collected data on recurrence risks for a number of pediatric conditions, to answer the questions of the parents of affected children. He helped develop the principles of genetic counseling. He showed that cortisone, injected into pregnant mice, caused cleft palates in the offspring, and that the frequency of induced clefts varied with the genotype, thus bringing genetics into teratology. From this he developed the multifactorial threshold model that underlies many common familial conditions.

But Fraser's contributions reached far beyond the lab to the very lives of patients everywhere. His gentle, compassionate approach was much appreciated by his patients and he passed this warmth and understanding onto a succession of graduate students, physicians and genetic counsellors in both Canada and the United States. Ever contributing in a myriad of ways, Dr. Fraser's classroom techniques were renowned among students and he coauthored several textbooks, many still used today.

Further reading

References

External links
 Frank Clarke Fraser at The Canadian Encyclopedia
 F. Clarke Fraser fonds at the Osler Library of the History of Medicine, McGill University.

1920 births
2014 deaths
Acadia University alumni
Canadian geneticists
Medical geneticists
Fellows of the Royal Society of Canada
McGill University Faculty of Medicine alumni
Academic staff of McGill University
Academic staff of the Memorial University of Newfoundland
Officers of the Order of Canada
People from Norwich, Connecticut
People educated at Munro College
Canadian expatriates in the United States